Charles Russell (born May 9, 1958) is an American filmmaker and actor known for his work on several genre films.

Some of Russell's best known films include the slasher fantasy film A Nightmare on Elm Street 3: Dream Warriors, the 1988 remake of the 1958 monster horror film The Blob, the fantasy superhero comedy film The Mask, the action film Eraser, and the action-adventure The Scorpion King. Russell also executive produced the critically acclaimed Michael Mann-directed neo-noir action thriller Collateral.

Early life 

Russell was born in Park Ridge, Illinois and grew up in Chicago. He attended Maine South High School and was a graduate of the 1976 class. While attending the University of Illinois, Russell became fascinated with Chicago's active theater scene and began writing, acting and directing one act plays. Chicago's famous Second City Theater was an inspiration for Russell, where he saw such comedians as John Belushi and Dan Aykroyd get their start. Russell became fascinated with comedy improv, studying techniques he later applied in the development of such films as Back to School and The Mask.

After graduating from the University of Illinois, Russell left Chicago to begin work in film production in Los Angeles. He worked his way up, assistant directing and production managing independent films while writing screenplays.

Career 
Russell made his directorial debut in 1987 with A Nightmare on Elm Street 3: Dream Warriors. At that time, New Line Cinema was uncertain about the future of the Elm Street franchise. Russell convinced them that the series could take a step further into Freddy's nightmare world through advanced visual effects and dramatize the bond among Freddy's youthful victims with the concept of Dream Warriors. The success of the film redefined the franchise for New Line, earning more at the box office than the first two films put together. 

Russell went on to write and direct the cult horror film, The Blob in 1988, once again stretching the boundaries of visual effects on a limited budget. He then found international acclaim with the blockbuster The Mask about a bank clerk who discovers an ancient mask that transforms him into a malicious prankster who uses practical jokes to fight crime. Russell created groundbreaking digital technologies for The Mask with George Lucas's Industrial Light and Magic, combining live action performance with radically new concepts in visual effects. Russell's work earned the film an Academy Award nomination for Best Visual Effects. The Mask also created international stardom for both Jim Carrey and Cameron Diaz. With a production budget of $18 million, The Mask earned more than $350 million in worldwide box office.

Russell then went on to direct the action films Eraser with Arnold Schwarzenegger, which grossed over $240 million internationally, and The Scorpion King, which was the first leading role for WWE star Dwayne "The Rock" Johnson. Both films were #1 box office hits upon their release.

Fourteen years after directing The Scorpion King, Russell's next film was 2016's I Am Wrath starring John Travolta. In 2019, he directed Junglee, an Indian action-adventure film that released on March 29, 2019. For Junglee, the 60-year-old director worked with elephants and the song-and-dance tradition unique to Indian cinema for the first time. Both were inspiring, he told Scroll.in during a recent visit to Mumbai.

Filmography 

Producer credits

Indian films

Television

References

External links 

 
 

1958 births
Film producers from Illinois
American male film actors
American male screenwriters
Horror film directors
Living people
Actors from Park Ridge, Illinois
Artists from Park Ridge, Illinois
20th-century American male actors
Film directors from Illinois
Screenwriters from Illinois